Émile Joseph Demangel (20 June 1882 – 11 October 1968)  was a French amateur track cyclist who competed in several sprint events at the 1906 Intercalated Games and 1908 Summer Olympics. In 1906 he finished fourth in the 5,000 m and 333⅓ m time trial events. At the 1908 Games he served as the flag bearer for the French delegation, won a silver medal in the 660 yards sprint, and placed fifth in the 1,980 yards team pursuit. The same year he set a world record in the paced 500 metre time trial and won a bronze medal in the sprint at the world championships. A street in Xertigny, where he died in 1968, is named for him.

References

1882 births
1968 deaths
French male cyclists
French track cyclists
Olympic cyclists of France
Cyclists at the 1906 Intercalated Games
Cyclists at the 1908 Summer Olympics
Olympic silver medalists for France
Olympic medalists in cycling
Sportspeople from Vosges (department)
Medalists at the 1908 Summer Olympics
Cyclists from Grand Est